Nikhom Chuboon, also known as Sornpichai Kratingdaenggym or Sornpichai Pitsanurachan,  is a Thai former professional boxer who competed from 1995 to 2001 and held the WBA flyweight title from 1999 to 2000.

Biography and career

In early 1996, he won the WBU flyweight title came in a twelve-round win over Angel Almena in Chiang Rai. He defended the title five times before being stripped in 1997. In the first defense he traveled to Italy to face the Luigi Castiglione at Town Square, San Mango d'Aquino, on 8 August 1996. Sornpichai won via unanimous decision. He also defeated Daniel Ward in Loei the same year.

In 1998, he moved up in weight to the super flyweight division and won the PABA title. He defended it four times before returning to flyweight.

On September 3, 1999 he challenged for the WBA flyweight title against reigning champion Leo Gámez in Mukdahan. Sornpichai defeated Gámez via eighth-round knockout to capture the WBA title.

He lost the title in his second defense against Eric Morel at the Alliant Energy Center, Madison, Wisconsin on 5 August 2000.

Retirement
Sornpichai retired after losing ninth-round knockout to a Japanese Jun Toriumi in early 2004 at Korakuen Hall, Tokyo, Japan. He then traveled as a trainer to certain countries such as China and Vietnam, but then returned to Thailand because of eye injuries. This was a result of his boxing since he was just 10 years old.

He currently lives with his only daughter born to an ex-wife who left him.

Muay Thai record

|-  style="background:#fbb;"
| 1995-06-10|| Loss ||align=left| Dao-Udon Sor.Suchart ||  || Lampang, Thailand || Decision || 5 || 3:00

|-  style="background:#cfc;"
| 1995-05-06|| Win||align=left| Sakpaitoon Decharat || Silapa Muay Thai Nai Khanom Tom, Lumpinee Stadium || Bangkok, Thailand || Decision || 5 || 3:00

|-  style="background:#cfc;"
| 1995-02-13|| Win||align=left| Prakayfai Kor.Bangkruai ||  Rajadamnern Stadium || Bangkok, Thailand || KO|| 2 || 

|-  style="background:#cfc;"
| 1994-12-18|| Win||align=left| Narongnoi Kiatsarika ||  Rajadamnern Stadium || Bangkok, Thailand || KO (Left hook)|| 3 || 

|-  style="background:#cfc;"
| 1994-12-01|| Win||align=left| Singngern Lurkangsi ||  Rajadamnern Stadium || Bangkok, Thailand || Decision || 5 || 3:00

|-
| colspan=9 | Legend:

See more
List of world flyweight boxing champions

References

External links

Sornpichai Kratingdaenggym
Southpaw boxers
Flyweight boxers
Super-flyweight boxers
Living people
Year of birth missing (living people)
World Boxing Association champions
Date of birth missing (living people)
Boxing trainers
Thai expatriate sportspeople in China
Thai expatriate sportspeople in Vietnam
Sornpichai Kratingdaenggym
Sornpichai Kratingdaenggym